Capiz may refer to:

 Capiz Province, Western Visayas Region, Philippines
 Roxas City, capital of Capiz Province, formerly also called Capiz
 Capiz shell, the mollusk placuna placenta